The individual dressage event was one of six equestrian events on the Equestrian at the 1988 Summer Olympics programme. The competition was held at the Seoul Race Park in Seoul.

The competition was split into two phases:

Qualifying Round (24–25 September)
Riders performed the Grand Prix test. The eighteen riders with the highest scores advanced to the final (maximum 3 per nation).
Final (27 September)
Riders performed the Grand Prix Special test.

Results

References

External links
1988 Summer Olympics official report Volume 2 p. 358. 

Individual dressage